Namungo Football Club is a Tanzanian football club based in Lindi, Tanzania. The club currently plays in the Tanzanian Premier League, the highest league in the Tanzanian football league system.

External links
Team profile – soccerway.com

References 

Football clubs in Tanzania